Dolino is a rural locality (a settlement) in Maloshelkovnikovsky Selsoviet, Yegoryevsky District, Altai Krai, Russia. The population was 39 as of 2013.

Geography 
Dolino is located 55 km south of Novoyegoryevskoye (the district's administrative centre) by road. Kruglo-Sementsy is the nearest rural locality.

References 

Rural localities in Yegoryevsky District, Altai Krai